Nataliya Zinchenko (born 3 October 1979) is a former Ukrainian football player who currently acts as manager for Zvezda Perm.

Career
Zinchenko joined Zvezda Perm in 2007 and furthermore served as the team's captain; under his tenure, the team reached the final of the 2008-09 UEFA Women's Cup. She previously played for Ryazan VDV. After having retired due to injury in 2010 she replaced Shek Borkowski as the manager at Zvezda Perm.

Throughout her career she won seven Russian leagues, two Russian cups, two Ukrainian leagues and one Ukrainian cup.

International career
She was a member of the Ukrainian national team and played her debut 22 October 1995 against Hungary.

References

1979 births
Living people
People from Desna
Ukrainian women's footballers
WFC Lehenda-ShVSM Chernihiv players
WFC Donchanka Donetsk players
WFC Alina Kyiv players
Expatriate women's footballers in Russia
Ryazan-VDV players
FC Energy Voronezh players
Zvezda 2005 Perm players
Ukraine women's international footballers
Women's association football midfielders
Ukrainian expatriate sportspeople in Russia
Ukraine women's national football team managers
WFC Zhytlobud-2 Kharkiv managers
Ukrainian football managers
Female association football managers
Ukrainian women's football managers
Sportspeople from Chernihiv Oblast